Aleksandr Valeryevich Gorbachyov (born 7 October 1986) is a former Russian former professional footballer.

External links
 
 

1986 births
Sportspeople from Rostov-on-Don
Living people
Russian footballers
Association football defenders
FC SKA Rostov-on-Don players
FC Partizan Minsk players
AC Oulu players
Belarusian Premier League players
Kakkonen players
Russian expatriate footballers
Expatriate footballers in Belarus
Expatriate footballers in Finland